Hong Ok-song (born February 16, 1984) is a North Korean judoka.

Participating in the half-middleweight category (63 kg) at the 2004 Olympic Games, she finished seventh, having lost the repechage semi-final to Driulis González of Cuba.

She won a bronze medal in the lightweight category (57 kg) at the 2006 Asian Games, having defeated Khishigbatyn Erdenet-Od of Mongolia in the bronze medal match.

She currently resides in Pyongyang.

External links
2006 Asian Games profile

1984 births
Living people
North Korean female judoka
Judoka at the 2004 Summer Olympics
Olympic judoka of North Korea
Asian Games medalists in judo
Judoka at the 2002 Asian Games
Judoka at the 2006 Asian Games
Asian Games gold medalists for North Korea
Asian Games bronze medalists for North Korea
Medalists at the 2002 Asian Games
Medalists at the 2006 Asian Games
Universiade medalists in judo
Universiade gold medalists for North Korea
21st-century North Korean women